The K class was a branch line steam locomotive that ran on Victorian Railways in Australia from 1922 to 1979.  Although its design was entirely conventional and its specifications unremarkable, the K class was in practice a remarkably versatile and dependable locomotive.  It went on to outlast every other class of steam locomotive in regular service on the VR, and no fewer than 21 examples of the 53 originally built have survived into preservation.

History 

The K class was the first design from the VR Locomotive Design Section under the stewardship of Alfred E Smith as Chief Mechanical Engineer.

The Locomotive Design Section had introduced successful mainline and branchline passenger locomotives with the A2 class and Dd class 4-6-0s, and had recently improved mainline goods services with the C class 2-8-0. They now turned their attention to a requirement for a more powerful branchline goods locomotive, and in 1922 produced a lighter 2-8-0 "Consolidation" locomotive with a  axle load and  wheelbase, able to run on even the lightest lines on the VR  system.

Regular service 

The K class is credited with working virtually every line in the VR system and hauling almost every kind of train.

A total of ten were built from 1922 to 1923, numbered 100–109. They were put to work on goods services on steeply graded branch lines where their superior tractive effort (45% higher than that of the Dd class) and high factor of adhesion were put to good use.

The K, with its firebox mounted between the frames, was unsuitable for standard gauge conversion. The K class proved to be such a successful locomotive that, despite not being gauge convertible, a further 29 units were ordered just before World War II, being delivered between 1940 and 1941. The first of the new engines was 140, quickly renumbered 150 then followed by 151 to 178; the original ten engines were also renumbered 140–149. In 1942 a further order was placed for an additional 21 engines, which would have brought the fleet total to 61 engines. However, only five of this batch - 179 to 183 - entered service during 1943, and construction was halted until after the end of hostilities when work resumed on engines K184 to K192. The remaining engines were never built.

The decision to build more Ks reflected their greater versatility: they had the same tractive effort as the N class but unlike the longer wheelbase N class the K could be turned on the smallest turntables.

Although originally designed as a goods locomotive, their maximum permissible speed was raised for branchline passenger service, further increasing their versatility.

The success of the K class was such that even in 1953, with dieselisation already underway on Victorian Railways, the basic design of the K class was updated into the J class 2-8-0, the final class of steam locomotives to be introduced to the Victorian Railways.

Design improvements 

During the mid-1930s, the original batch of ten K class locomotives were equipped with VR's 'Modified Front End' for improved drafting and reduced cylinder back pressure. They also saw other improvements, such as the fitting of cross-compound air compressors, smoke deflectors and a new welded tender tank which incorporated a self-trimming coal bunker.

The last seven of the second order of K class locomotives built in 1940-46 were fitted with Boxpok wheels.

Demise

The introduction of the T class (EMD G8) diesel electric locomotive from 1955 onwards on VR's branchline network spelled the beginning of the end for the K class, with Ks gradually being retired as successive orders of Ts were delivered throughout the 1950s and into the 1960s. Even so, their reliable and low-cost operability ensured they remained in service around various yards and depots as shunters and workshop pilots until the Y class (EMD G6B) locomotive eventually superseded them in this role.

On 20 January 1965 locomotive K 188 was used in a public ending of steam on the Victorian Railways, when it was used in the demolition of the North Melbourne Locomotive Depot, pulling down the front wall with a steel rope before a crowd of onlookers. North Ballarat Workshops pilot K 162 had the honour of being the last steam locomotive in service on Victorian Railways, withdrawn in March 1979, and was subsequently allocated to Steamrail Victoria.

Preservation 

With the rail preservation movement well under way by the late 1960s, many ex-VR locomotives were sold to local councils for display in municipal parks or near railway stations.  The K had a further advantage over other classes in this respect: because VR offered the locomotives for the price of their scrap value (plus the cost of freight to their eventual destination), the relatively lightweight K represented a comparatively cheap locomotive purchase.  The large number of preserved K class locomotives is in stark contrast to the fate of VR's remaining fleet of 73 larger, heavier N class locomotives, all of which (other than the one example retained for display at the Newport Railway Museum) were scrapped.

By the time VR announced the cessation of steam locomotive scrapping in 1978, no fewer than 21 of an original 53 K class locomotives remained in existence, making them in preservation the most numerous class of VR steam locomotives.  However, none of the original batch of ten locomotives survives.

Note the following list follows traditional practice, with locomotives identified by the at-construction frame number, regardless of numbers worn at any other time or parts swapped.

Operational 

K 153: Owned by VicTrack and managed by Steamrail Victoria. When in Melbourne, it is regularly used on suburban shuttles and on day tours to Geelong and similar-length trips. Throughout its preservation career (starting from 1974), the engine has been painted all-over black with some details picked out in white or yellow (such as handrails and the staff exchanger horn, welded in the raised position) to meet modern safety standards.
K 163: In regular service on the preserved Mornington Railway, hauling passenger services between Moorooduc and Mornington. The engine had been withdrawn from Government service in December 1968, at Ararat. It then sat idle for a few years, before being sold to the Frankston Apex Club in November 1973, and placed in the Frankston Jubilee Park. Within a few months it had been painted teal green above the frames. In 1984, the engine was sold to the Mornington Railway Preservation Society, and a boiler certificate was granted in July 1985. In November that year, the engine was moved to the Cresco sidings at Hastings for restoration, and moved under its own power for the first time ten months later. Fully restored in May 1987, and painted in a bright green scheme, with a similar layout similar to that of K190 at the time. By 1995 the engine had been repainted to a much darker green, with red lining and black smokebox and smoke deflectors, and as of 2004, the engine had gold boiler bands. The engine was under overhaul from 7 February to 21 November 2010, then it re-entered service, in the same livery but with the red changed to the same dark green, and regularly running without smoke deflectors. This overhaul utilised the boiler from K 191. The engine was used as the locomotive on train scene in part 3 of The Pacific. In 2020, K163 was transferred to Steamrail Victoria's Newport Workshops depot for a visit to the wheel lathe at Downer Newport and repairs to the crankpins.
K 183: Had been in service with Steamrail Victoria until 13 October 2002, when this locomotive was involved in a serious level crossing accident with a B-double semi-trailer near Benalla, Victoria, derailing after impact. Tragically, three people on the footplate died in the collision. The locomotive was extensively damaged and was stored out of service in East Block at Newport Workshops until 30 June 2020 when it was moved to Steamrail's depot at West Block. After an assessment on the condition of the engine, Steamrail have decided to restore the locomotive to mainline operating standard. K183 was successfully repaired to running condition in October 2021, running its first mainline test in 19 years with S313 between Newport and Sunshine 7 October 2021. Before its initial restoration, the engine had been plinthed at Yarragon following withdrawal from the Victorian Railways; The Shire of Narracan had selected that engine specifically, believing it to have spent a majority of its life in the region though it is not clear if this is actually correct. In 1982 the engine unit was swapped for K 162, though the tender units remained at Yarragon and Newport respectively. In 1992, K 183 re-entered service under Steamrail, with the tender formerly attached to K 162, and in a dark blue with yellow lining livery.
K 190: Owned by VicTrack and operated by Steamrail Victoria, and as of September 2017 it is operating on the Victorian Goldfields Railway in Maldon. It is regularly used on suburban shuttles and on day tours to Geelong and similar-length trips. When first restored in 1977 at Bayswater and Newport, the engine was painted in a two-tone green livery using Dulux Verdant Green for the main body, British Paints Emerald Green for the wheels and borders, Sign Writer gold (lemon tint) for the lining; Dulux black enamel for the frames, tender bogies and smoke deflectors, Dulux bright red for the front and rear buffer beams, Dulux Cumberland Stone for the cab interior and Bituminious Black for the smokebox. This lasted until 1992, after which the engine was returned to a plain black livery. In 1995, she was leased to the South Gippsland railway, and that organisation gave a simpler version of the green livery, using apple green on the boiler, cab, tender and cylinders (with limited dark green lining), red buffer beams both ends, and matt black frames and wheels. By 4 November 2000 the engine had returned to Steamrail in Melbourne, and been repainted gloss black; by Easter of 2001 the front buffer beam had been repainted red. The engine spent some time around 2010 on the Maldon railway. On Saturday 12 March 2016, the engine was restored to service in a new crimson with yellow, black and red livery, along the same lines as the R 766's previous livery. Both were inspired by the London, Midland and Scottish Railway's crimson lake livery.

Under restoration
K 154: Was previously on display in the "Old Moe Town" Historical Park. This locomotive is now the focus of the N441 - Steam Locomotive Project to convert the locomotive into a 1st series N class 2-8-2 by the Locomotive Restoration Group based at Newport Workshops. In early 2016, the project was shifted from Newport to Traralgon but the locomotive remains stored at Newport Workshops.
K 160: Owned by the Victorian Goldfields Railway in Maldon. After being in service for 26 years, from 1986 to 2012, the engine was finally worn out and had to be transferred to Newport Workshops for a major overhaul. While in service it had always been painted a simple matte black.
K 174: Moorooduc, with the Mornington Railway. This engine had been plinthed at the Edinburgh Gardens in Fitzroy (near the former Fitzroy Railway Station) until 18 May 1997, when it was acquired by the Mornington Railway Preservation Society and transferred to Moorooduc by road. The engine was in generally terrible condition, with most fittings missing and the remainder of parts damaged, except the engine frames which were in surprisingly good condition by comparison. The tender tank had fittings removed and was scrapped at Moorooduc, being beyond repair, and the tender frame and the brake gear for the locomotive demonstrated significant collision damage. The rest of the parts were placed in a pool to be used to reassemble a future engine; at the end of the project, the pool consisted of the boiler, smokebox, funnel and pony truck from 159 and 177; the loco frames, coupled wheels, axle boxes, motion gear and smoke deflectors from 159 and 174; the tender frame and bogies from 174 and 177, and the tender tank from 177 only. In 2000, the coupled wheels and motion gear from 174 was swapped with that from 176 at Seymour as the tyres from 174 required replacement, while 176's tyres were almost new; though both locomotives had poor condition axle boxes and crankpins. A few years later, the tender bogies from 174 were swapped with those from 191. When completed, the locomotive using K 174's frame is to be numbered K 177 and named City of Ararat, as part of the deal for parts acquisition.
K 191: Moorooduc, with the Mornington Railway. Previously on static display in Wangaratta, Victoria, was purchased by the Mornington Railway in 2001 and moved by low-loader to Moorooduc for restoration. It has been stripped down into its component parts for inspection and preliminary work as a restoration project by the Mornington Railway Preservation Society. The engine also had the tender bogies ex K 174 allocated. In 2010, the restoration of K 163 claimed K 191's boiler.

Static display
K 165 is preserved at the Newport Railway Museum, painted in traditional all-over black.

In addition, K class locomotives are also preserved on public display at various locations:
K 162: Yarragon, Victoria (numbered 'K-183': the two locomotives were swapped in 1982 when K 183 commenced restoration to working order, although K 183's tender remains.)
K 167: Wycheproof, Victoria, painted black with red lining.
K 169: Coal Creek Heritage Village, Korumburra, Victoria Painted black, with an external supply of steam piped to the whistle and cylinder drain cocks.
K 175: Mildura, Victoria; in a rather colourful green/red/black scheme applied by the local council after being placed on its plinth sometime between 1972 and 1975. This engine is fitted with spoked wheels, except for the main (third from front) driving axle which is fitted with boxpok wheels.
K 177: Hamilton, Victoria. Following withdrawal from service, this locomotive was sold to the Langhi Morgala Museum in Ararat and placed on display. It was subsequently acquired by the Mornington Railway Preservation Society and transferred to Moorooduc. Further inspection revealed a number of parts beyond restoration, so a complex deal was worked out with other organisations over the late 1990s. The end result was that the frame of K 177 was placed at Hamilton, Victoria, along with its own coupled wheels, motion gear and smoke deflectors. K 159 donated the tender body, frame and bogies, and K 174 provided the boiler, smokebox, funnel and pony truck. The engine is currently un-numbered, but during the transition process it was alternately known as the Hamilton Exchange Locomotive or K 193.
K 181: Numurkah, Victoria All-over black with limited red lining. Displayed alongside a replica station, with the verandah used to provide shelter and to help protect the locomotive from weathering.
K 192: State Coal Mine, Wonthaggi, Victoria Painted all-over black with red under the locomotive footplate, but with black buffer beam. For a time, the engine wore the identity of K 170.

Stored
K 151: Steamrail Newport, locomotive only, at Steamrail's Newport Workshops depot, owned by Victrack. Used as a supply of spare parts to keep other engines in service.
K 157: Maldon, with the Victorian Goldfields Railway. Used as a supply of spare parts to keep K 160 in service.
K 159: Moorooduc, with the Mornington Railway. Was plinthed at Hamilton in Western Victoria until that council was approached by the Mornington railway, looking to swap around a series of locomotive parts in order to restore more engines. In 1997 the engine was transferred to Moorooduc; however the Hamilton City Council wanted to retain a K Class locomotive for display purposes, so the remaining parts from the Mornington swap were reassembled and delivered back to Hamilton in 1998. The true K 159 engine unit is currently used as a supply of spare parts to keep other engines in service, with a long-term intent to restore to operational condition. However, because K 174's tender tank was beyond restoration, this engine at Moorooduc has no tender tank attached to the tender frame. The current list of parts ex 159, 174 and 177 at Moorooduc is listed in the K 174 entry above.
K 176: Seymour, with the Seymour Rail Heritage Centre. Generally used as a supply of parts for other organisations, to keep their locomotives in service.  Was previously plinthed on the Deniliquin turntable. Driving wheels and associated motion was provided to the Mornington railway following the parts swap project between K 159, K 174, K 177. The locomotive now sits on the driving wheels previously from K 174 at Fitzroy, having been swapped over during a single weekend in 2000. Since then the engine has been sitting outside in the Seymour Rail Heritage Centre.
K 184: Steamrail Newport, locomotive only, owned by Victrack.. Was used on heritage services with Steamrail Victoria through the 1970s, painted all over gloss black with red frames and buffer beams. The engine was withdrawn in 1980 and is now used as a source of spare parts; other Steamrail K Class locomotives occasionally wear its number plates and headlight number boards.
W 843: K Class tender, at Steamrail's Newport Workshops depot, owned by Victrack. Possibly previously with K 151 or K 184.
W 859: K Class tender, at Steamrail's Newport Workshops depot, owned by Victrack. Possibly previously with K 151 or K 184.

Model railways

HO Scale
The VR K Class locomotive was previously available in HO Scale as a brass and Whitemetal kit, by Broad Gauge Models. There were also a limited production run of brass "Ready-to-Run" models produced by Precision Scale Models in the mid-1990s. A limited production run of brass "Ready-to-Run" models was produced by Trainbuilder in 2013/14.

A plastic version is currently in development by Eureka Models and is due in 2017. Planned numbers are K150, 155, 160, 166, 172, 187 and 192 in black, 163 in one of the Mornington green schemes, 183 in Steamrail's blue livery, 184 in Steamrail's black with red livery and 190 in Steamrail's red livery.

Trainbuilder has released a series of locomotives, including K150, 160, 164, 175, 186, 188 and 192 in black, and 183 in Steamrail's blue scheme and 190 in Steamrail's green scheme.

N Scale
An N scale kit version is available from badgerbits using a MicroAce 9600 as a basis.

References 
 
 
 
  (includes pictures of K Class locos in action)
 Article outlining the history of K163

Specific

External links 
 victorianrailways.net K class locomotive page Details and further photographs of K class locomotives
 Steamrail Victoria operators of K 153, K 183 and K 190
 Victorian Goldfields Railway operators of K 160
 Mornington Railway operators of K 163
 Victorian Preserved Steam Locomotives detailed information about all surviving ex-VR steam locos

2-8-0 locomotives
K class
Railway locomotives introduced in 1922
Broad gauge locomotives in Australia